Nicos Solomonides Arena is an indoor arena in Limassol, Cyprus. It is the home venue of AEL basketball team and has a capacity of 2,500 seats. The name was given after a former president of the club.

The arena features the club's offices, official club shop, a cafe-restaurant, workout area and 12 VIP boxes.

It is also the base for AEL's women's basketball and volleyball clubs.

References

Indoor arenas in Cyprus
Basketball venues in Cyprus
Sports venues in Cyprus
Buildings and structures in Limassol